The Château de Calmont d'Olt is a castle situated in France, in the Aveyron département in the commune of Espalion. Perched atop a basalt dyke at an altitude of 535 m, it overlooks from 100 m the town of Espalion and the valley of the Lot. It provides a panoramic view of the Aubrac highlands.

History 
Flint fragments and a polished stone axe are evidence of occupation of the site for 5,000 years. The ministerium Calvomantese was first mentioned in 883, in documents from the Abbey at Conques. It has always had a military significance, commanding the road from Rodez to Aubrac and, more widely, the crossing of the River Lot on the Toulouse-Lyon route. The building of the castle was begun in the 11th century built and continued until the Hundred Years' War with the building of a second curtain with eight towers in 1400.  Beyond this date, there was no further development. Abandoned by its owners in the 16th century, the castle fell to ruin. The castle, in its present state, is an important milestone in the history of castle building in medieval Rouergue. It bears witness to the architectural adaptations of castles to the technical progress of the Hundred Years' War.

Chronology
 For detailed chronology, see French Wikipedia.

Today
Registered as a historic monument (monument historique) in 1992 by the French Ministry of Culture, in 1987 the castle was bought by Thierry Plume who gradually renovated it and had it classified in 1992. From this date, with the assistance of Bâtiments de France and the regional archaeological service and thanks to the help of volunteers working summers with the castle team, the site has little by little been reborn.

Tourism 
The castle is part of the Route des Seigneurs du Rouergue (Route of the Lords of Rouergue) which groups 23 castles. In 1997, it was awarded the Trophée du Tourisme culturel en Midi-Pyrénées (Trophy of cultural tourism in Midi-Pyrénées).

The site highlights the theme of siege warfare. Full-scale war machines have been reconstructed and visitors may assist in the launching of projectiles with:

 siege tower from the 15th century with bombards
 couillard from the 15th century
 trébuchet from the 14th century
 pierrière from Petrus de Eboli from the 12th century
 pierrière from the siege of Toulouse from the 13th century

Visitors are also invited to take part in other demonstrations including archery, fencing and making chain mail.

See also
 List of castles in France
 Route des Seigneurs du Rouergue

References

External links
 
 Official Château website 
 Route des Seigneurs du Rouergue website, with photos 

Castles in Aveyron
Monuments historiques of Aveyron
Ruined castles in Occitania (administrative region)